I Am a Singer is a popular South Korean singing competition program; a part of MBC's Sunday Night lineup. Seven talented, veteran Korean singers perform for a selected audience, which votes to eliminate one singer after each week's performance. The following week, another singer joins the competition, and the lineup of artists varies throughout the course of the show. The program ended its first season on February 19, 2012. Its second season ended in May 2012. Its third season ended on April 24, 2015.

I Am a Singer differs from other televised music competitions in that the participants are all veteran musicians who have established music careers varying from mega stardom to relative obscurity. Due to this fact, and because none of the accomplished singers desire to be voted last amongst their peers and eliminated, the level of performance is usually high and acclaimed by critics and viewers alike.

Composition 
The show is divided into rounds. Each round consists of two performance episodes, one that is preliminary and the second final performance which determines the lowest ranking contestant to be eliminated.  In between performance are also separate intermediate episodes that document the singers' progress and rehearsals.

Contestants are popular and prominent artists from various genres of the Korean music industry. Each contestant is paired with a "manager", seven Korean entertainers and comedians who serve as mentors, accompany their singers throughout the week to provide support during rehearsals and provide comic relief to the show.

The competition is documented by the week. At the beginning of the 1st performance week, each contestant selects a song of their choice. All contestants spend the week practicing and planning, given free rein on the interpretation of their songs and the staging of their performances. After the performance, votes from the 500-member studio audience determine the singers' rankings, although there is no elimination.

For the 2nd performance week, the singers gather and are assigned predetermined songs that fit their vocal range and style, and the rest of the week is spent in rehearsals and consulting with other musicians. These intermediate episodes include sample performances in the middle of the week, allowing the contestants to exhibit their progress in front of fellow competitors. The competitors privately vote for 1st and 7th place, determining the singers' rankings to serve as a checkpoint.

Final performances are given, again, in front of a live audience. At the end of the performances, the audience casts votes for three favorites. The results are revealed sans audience to the contestants and managers, ranking competitors from first to seventh. The competitor with the lowest average ranking is eliminated, and the next week sees a new singer added to the competition.

Starting from Round 1, the average of both performance scores is taken and the contestant with the lowest total of votes is eliminated, as new contestant replace him/her.

Singers who survive 7 times in a row graduate from the program.

Competition Results 
P = Pass, E = Eliminated, G = Graduated, L = Voluntarily Left, R = Re-challenge

List of episodes in Season 1

Episodes 1-3: Pilot 
Episode 1 - 1st Performance
Broadcast: March 6, 2011

Episode 2 - Interim Check
Broadcast: March 13, 2011

Episode 3 - 2nd Performance
Broadcast: March 20, 2011

Eliminated: Kim Gun-mo

Episode 4: Controversy 
Broadcast: March 27, 2011
Kim Gun-mo was eliminated on Episode 3, but the singers all felt that it was too early to be eliminated so he was brought back to try again. This angered the viewers since there were rules in place prior to broadcasting that a singer with the lowest ranking would be eliminated which would bring new singers into the program.

Eliminated: Jung Yeob

Episode 5: Managers' Special 
Broadcast: April 24, 2011
Due to the controversy with Kim Gun-mo being eliminated and returning, this episode showed the manager's point of view of the broadcasts and the singers thus far.

Episode 6: Exhibition and New Singers 
Broadcast: May 1, 2011
The program restarted with some changes, taking both Kim Gun-mo (who was originally eliminated) and Jung Yeob (who was newly eliminated) out of the competition. Baek Ji-young withdrew, citing that she had to prepare for her upcoming album, and three new singers were introduced.
This was an exhibition episode; no one was eliminated.

Episodes 7-9: Round 1 
Episode 7 - 1st Performance
Broadcast: May 8, 2011
The contestants sing a song they want to sing.

Episode 8 - Interim Check
Broadcast: May 15, 2011

Episode 9 - 2nd Performance
Broadcast: May 22, 2011

Eliminated: Kim Yeon-woo

Episodes 10-12: Round 2 
Episode 10 - 1st Performance
Broadcast: May 29, 2011

Episode 11 - Interim Check
Broadcast: June 5, 2011

Episode 12 - 2nd Performance
Broadcast: June 12, 2011

Eliminated: Lee So-ra
JK Kim Dong-wook withdrew from the competition due to making a lyrical mistake in his performance.

Episodes 13-15: Round 3 
Episode 13 - 1st Performance
Broadcast: June 19, 2011

Episode 14 - Interim Check
Broadcast: June 26, 2011

Episode 15 - 2nd Performance
Broadcast: July 3, 2011

Eliminated: BMK

Episodes 16-18: Round 4 
Episode 16 - 1st Performance
Broadcast: July 10, 2011

Episode 17 - Interim Check
Broadcast: July 17, 2011

Episode 18 - 2nd Performance
Broadcast: July 24, 2011

Eliminated: Ock Joo-hyun

Episodes 19-21: Round 5 
Episode 19 - 1st Performance
Broadcast: July 31, 2011

Episode 20 - Interim Check
Broadcast: August 7, 2011

Episode 21 - 2nd Performance
Broadcast: August 14, 2011

Eliminated: Yoon Do-hyun
Honor Graduation: Park Jung-hyun, Kim Bum-soo

Episode 22: Graduation and Exhibition 
Broadcast: August 21, 2011
Three new singers are introduced into the competition. All contestants performed one of their own songs. This is an exhibition episode; no one was eliminated.

Graduation Performance: Park Jung-hyun and Kim Bum-soo singing 사랑보다 깊은 상처 (Im Jae-bum, Park Jung-hyun)

Episodes 23-25: Round 6 
Episode 23 - 1st Performance
Broadcast: August 28, 2011

Episode 24 - Interim Check
Broadcast: September 4, 2011

Episode 25 - 2nd Performance
Broadcast: September 11, 2011

Eliminated: Kim Jo-han

Episodes 26-28: Round 7 
Episode 26 - 1st Performance
Broadcast: September 18, 2011

Episode 27 - Interim Check
Broadcast: September 25, 2011

Episode 28 - 2nd Performance (Cho Yong-pil Special)
Broadcast: October 2, 2011
The contestants performed songs of their choice by Cho Yong-pil.

Eliminated: Jo Kwan-woo

Episodes 29-31: Round 8 
Episode 29 - 1st Performance (Duet Special)
Broadcast: October 9, 2011

Episode 30 - Interim Check
Broadcast: October 16, 2011
Insooni had a performance at Carnegie Hall and was absent. The lowest ranking is 6th place.

Episode 31 - 2nd Performance
Broadcast: October 23, 2011
The contestants and managers were flown to Melbourne, Australia, where they held a special concert for the 2nd performance at the Sidney Myer Music Bowl to an audience of 2,000. Unlike previous final performances, there was no predetermined setlist and all contestants performed a song of their choice.

Eliminated: Jo Kyu-chan

Episode 32: Australia Exhibition 
Broadcast: October 30, 2011
Seven former contestants and graduates accompanied the current singers to Melbourne, where they also performed songs of their choice. The audience also voted to rank the singers, although no one was eliminated.

Episodes 33-35: Round 9 
Episode 33: 1st Performance
Broadcast: November 6, 2011

Episode 34: Interim Check
Broadcast: November 13, 2011

Episode 35: 2nd Performance (Switch Special)
Broadcast: November 20, 2011
The contestants performed another contestant's original song.

Eliminated: Jang Hye-jin

Episodes 36-38: Round 10 
Episode 36: 1st Performance
Broadcast: November 27, 2011

Episode 37: Interim Check
Broadcast: December 4, 2011

Episode 38: 2nd Performance (Sanullim Special)
Broadcast: December 11, 2011
The contestants performed songs of their choice by Sanullim or song that Sanullim's member compose.

Eliminated: Insooni

Episodes 39-41: Round 11 
Episode 39: 1st Performance
Broadcast: December 18, 2011
The contestants sing a song they want to sing.

Episode 40: Interim Check
Broadcast: December 25, 2011

Episode 41: 2nd Performance
Broadcast: January 1, 2012
The contestants performed a former contestant's original song.

Eliminated: Bobby Kim
Honor Graduation: Jaurim

Episodes 42-44: Round 12 
Episode 42: 1st Performance
Broadcast: January 8, 2012
The contestants sing a song they want to sing.

Episode 43: Interim Check
Broadcast: January 15, 2012

Episode 44: 2nd Performance
Broadcast: January 22, 2012
The contestants sing a song their choice by O.S.T

Eliminated: Tei
Honor Graduation: Yoon Min-soo

Episodes 45-47: Round 13 
Episode 45: 1st Performance
Broadcast: January 29, 2012
The contestants sing a song they want to sing.

Episode 46: Interim Check
Broadcast: February 5, 2012

Episode 47: 2nd Performance
Broadcast: February 12, 2012

Eliminated: None
Honor Graduation: Kim Kyung-ho

International franchise 
 Franchise with a currently airing season
 Franchise with an upcoming season
 Franchise that has ended
 Franchise with an unknown status

See also 
Our Sunday Night

References

External links
  I Am a Singer on the Official Our Sunday Night homepage

 
MBC TV original programming
South Korean music television shows
South Korean reality television series
2011 South Korean television series debuts
Korean-language television shows
Music competitions in South Korea